Jordache Enterprises, Inc. is an American clothing company that markets apparel, including shirts, jeans, and outerwear. The brand is known for its designer jeans that were popular in the late 1970s and early 1980s. Since the 2000s, Jordache has also diversified into real estate in the United States and other ventures in Israel. The brand name Jordache is a contraction of Joe, Ralph, David, and Avi Naccache (Nakash).

History
Jordache originated in 1969, when Israeli brothers Joe, Ralph, and Avi Nakash (Naccache) opened a store in New York City that sold premium jeans. Inspired by European fashions, the brothers had developed a groundbreaking collection with a signature fit that was tight and sexy. Business expanded over the years, until the store was looted and set ablaze during the New York City blackout of 1977. In 1978, after they collected $120,000 from their insurance policy, they incorporated their business and started to manufacture. They had long been interested in the European denim market, where jeans were more body-conscious and fashion-forward.

The Nakashes' timing was right. At this moment, consumer taste in jeans was shifting from established brands such as Levi's to designer jeans such as Gloria Vanderbilt and Calvin Klein. However, Jordache jeans were barely distinguishable from other designer jeans on the market. To differentiate their brand, the brothers invested one quarter of their annual sales volume ($300,000 of their own money and $250,000 in loans) into an aggressive 1979 ad campaign.  Jordache produced a television commercial starring an apparently topless woman in tight Jordache jeans riding a horse through surf. The ad was rejected by all three major United States television networks, but independent New York stations aired it, and Jordache increased significantly in popularity.  Later, an additional one million dollars was spent on advertising, including full-color advertisements in magazines circulated nationally in the United States. One promotional gimmick that did not work out was the Jordache blimp, a poorly designed airship that crashed on October 8, 1980 at Lakehurst, New Jersey on its maiden flight. It was en route to a promotional gala and crashed 43 years after the Hindenburg airship disaster in the same city.

In the 1980s, the company expanded its reach with expansive licensing that generated up to $300 million per year of wholesale income. In 1989, the company had 100 licensees, manufacturing products as varied as children's socks, women's outerwear, jewelry, dresses, luggage, and umbrellas.

In the 1990s, this strategy appeared to have backfired, and Jordache products slid in popularity. The company's jeans "lost their cachet, appealing mainly to inner-city youth and blue-collar workers, and typically selling at discount stores." When Jordache designer diapers were manufactured by a licensee in 1994, they "seemed to symbolize Jordache's descent in the marketplace to mass-merchandise stores and discount outlets."

Jordache today
Today, Jordache Enterprises is a privately held conglomerate. The company designs and manufactures a wide variety of denim, apparel and accessories. In 2018, Jordache unveiled a premium denim collection in celebration of the brand's 40th anniversary.

The brands owned by Jordache Enterprises include: Jordache, Earl Jeans, KIKIT Jeans, Maurice Sasson, Fubu Ladies, Airport, Blue Star, and Gasoline. Jordache is an official licensee of the U.S. Polo Assn. brand.  Jordache Enterprises also manufactures private label denim for companies worldwide. 

Through the initial proceeds from the Jordache label, the Nakash brothers have expanded into Jordache Enterprises, Inc., with interests in real estate, hospitality, aviation, high-tech cryptography, maritime ventures, and agriculture. Among its more notable holdings beyond its namesake brand are real estate holdings in New York City, The Setai Miami in Miami, hotels throughout Europe and Israel, part of the Strip House restaurant chain, management of the Port of Eilat following its privatization, Arkia, Israel's second largest airline, and MG Aviation, an aircraft leasing firm with aircraft under lease to Norwegian Air Shuttle and eventually Arkia. Jordache Enterprises has two separate boards—one comprising six Nakashes and an outside board with 10 non-family members. Each male member of the second generation is highly specialized and has a nominal responsibility.

See also
Gitano Group Inc

Bounjour Jeans

Sasson Jeans

Guess Jeans

References

External links
Jordache Apparel website
 Jordache Enterprises Corporate Portfolio website

Jeans by brand
Clothing brands of the United States
Clothing companies based in New York City
American companies established in 1969
Clothing companies established in 1969
1969 establishments in New York City
1970s fashion
1980s fashion
1990s fashion